Regula Monachorum is a Latin phrase meaning "Rule for Monks". It may refer to:
 Rule for Monks by Aurelianus of Arles
 Rule of Saint Benedict
 Rule for Monks by Caesarius of Arles
 Rule of Saint Columbanus
 Rule for Monks by Isidore of Seville